Pendleton is a town in Anderson County, South Carolina, United States. The population was 3,489 at the 2020 census. It is a sister city of Stornoway in the Outer Hebrides of Scotland.

The Pendleton Historic District, consisting of the town and its immediate surroundings, was added to the National Register of Historic Places in 1970. Particularly notable historic buildings on the Pendleton town square include Farmer's Hall and Hunter's Store, which is currently the headquarters of the Pendleton District Historical, Recreational and Tourism Commission. Near Pendleton are the historic plantation homes Ashtabula and Woodburn.

History
For centuries, the land that is now Pendleton was the territory of the Cherokee nation. After England claimed South Carolina as a colony, the Cherokee traded with the British. After the Cherokee lost the war of 1759–60 against the British, the British dominated trade in the region and began to settle more of the land with large farms. Andrew Pickens, who was a general in the Revolutionary War moved to the area and commissioned the District of Pendleton in 1790. During the first half of the 1800s, wealthy families built homes in Pendleton. These homes were built as a summer vacation spot for the low-country plantation owners. Charles Cotesworth Pinckney (1789–1865) built Woodburn Plantation in 1830.

The Ashtabula, Boone-Douthit House, Faith Cabin Library at Anderson County Training School, Pendleton Historic District, and Woodburn are listed on the National Register of Historic Places.

Geography
Pendleton is located in northwestern Anderson County at  (34.650672, -82.780736). Its northwestern edge touches the Anderson County/Pickens County line and borders the city of Clemson. U.S. Route 76 passes through the southwest part of town, bypassing the town center and leading northwest to Clemson and southeast  to Anderson, the county seat.

Demographics

2020 census

As of the 2020 United States census, there were 3,489 people, 1,504 households, and 677 families residing in the town.

2000 census
As of the census of 2000, there were 2,966 people, 1,397 households, and 799 families residing in the town. The population density was 831.5 people per square mile (320.8/km2). There were 1,533 housing units at an average density of 429.7 per square mile (165.8/km2). The racial makeup of the town was 64.70% White, 33.07% African American, 0.20% Native American, 0.47% Asian, 0.54% from other races, and 1.01% from two or more races. Hispanic or Latino of any race were 1.52% of the population.

There were 1,397 households, out of which 21.0% had children under the age of 18 living with them, 37.0% were married couples living together, 16.8% had a female householder with no husband present, and 42.8% were non-families. 35.4% of all households were made up of individuals, and 12.5% had someone living alone who was 65 years of age or older. The average household size was 2.12 and the average family size was 2.75.

In the town, the population was spread out, with 20.2% under the age of 18, 12.8% from 18 to 24, 26.8% from 25 to 44, 22.6% from 45 to 64, and 17.6% who were 65 years of age or older. The median age was 38 years. For every 100 females, there were 83.1 males. For every 100 females age 18 and over, there were 77.5 males.

The median income for a household in the town was $28,052, and the median income for a family was $37,606. Males had a median income of $30,341 versus $23,843 for females. The per capita income for the town was $16,630. About 15.7% of families and 20.8% of the population were below the poverty line, including 32.2% of those under age 18 and 17.2% of those age 65 or over.

Education
Schools include Pendleton Elementary, Mount Lebanon Elementary, LaFrance Elementary, Riverside Middle School, and Pendleton High School. Tri-County Technical College is located within the town.

Pendleton has a public library, a branch of the Anderson County Library System.

Pendleton has 4 schools: 4 public schools and 0 private schools. Pendleton schools spend $11,812 per student (The US average is $12,383). There are 16 pupils per teacher, 488 students per librarian, and 366 children per counselor.

Notable residents
 Stephen Adams (1807–1857), born in the Pendleton District, United States congressman and senator
 Floride Calhoun, wife of U.S. Senator and Vice President John C. Calhoun, resided in the house known as "Mi Casa"
 Warren R. Davis (1793 – 1835), born Columbia, South Carolina. He studied law and was admitted to the bar in 1814, practicing in Pendleton. Davis was elected as a Jacksonian to the 20th United States Congress through 24th Congresses.
 Barnard Elliott Bee, Jr., born in Charleston, SC, 1824. He graduated West Point 1845, and as a Brigadier General, commanded the 3rd Brigade, Army of the Shenandoah, July 21, 1861, at Manassas, Va. He gave Gen. Thomas Jonathan Jackson the name "Stonewall."
Juanita Goggins, was the first African-American woman elected to the South Carolina legislature.
 Jane Edna Hunter, an African-American social worker. In 1911 she established the Working Girls Association in Cleveland, Ohio, which later became the Phillis Wheatley Association of Cleveland.
 Bryce McGowens is an American professional basketball player for the Charlotte Hornets of the National Basketball Association (NBA).
 Samuel Augustus Maverick, firebrand Texas rancher and politician from whom the word "maverick" originated, was born in Pendleton.

 Thomas Jefferson Rusk, early political and military leader of the Republic of Texas, serving as its first Secretary of War as well as a general at the Battle of San Jacinto.
 John Allen Wakefield, political and military leader, historian, took part in the Black Hawk War and Bleeding Kansas
 Margaret Sellers Walker (1935–2020), Michigan state official, born in Pendleton

References

External links
 Town of Pendleton official website
 Pendleton Historical Marker

 
Towns in Anderson County, South Carolina
Towns in South Carolina